Displaced is a 2006 British feature film produced by Skylandian Pictures. Produced by Mark Strange and directed by Martin Holland, the film took six years to make and secured a US distribution deal with Silverline Entertainment at the end of 2005.

Plot
Stel, a humanoid alien (Mark Strange), teams up with a British soldier John Marrettie (Malcolm Hankey). They are searching for a top secret file which contains information about advanced energy production, captured alien spacecraft and the extraterrestrial pilots. The missing include Stel's father, Arakawa, was shot down and imprisoned by Core – a paramilitary group.

The Displaced file is being held by a renegade 'special forces’ leader, Wilson (Graham Brownsmith) who plans to sell the information on the black market to the highest bidder. Marrettie is forced to help Stel in the search to locate the file.

Cast
Mark Strange as Stel
Malcolm Hankey as John Marrettie

External links
 

2006 films
2000s buddy films
2006 science fiction action films

British buddy films 
British martial arts films 
British science fiction action films
2006 martial arts films
2000s English-language films
2000s British films